Wish fulfillment is the satisfaction of a desire through an involuntary thought process. Wish fulfillment can occur in dreams or in daydreams, in the symptoms of neurosis, or in the hallucinations of psychosis. This satisfaction is often indirect and requires interpretation to recognize.

Sigmund Freud coined the term in 1900 in an early text titled The Interpretation of Dreams.  According to Freud, wish fulfillment occurs when unconscious desires are repressed by the ego and superego. This repression often stems from guilt and taboos imposed by society. Dreams are attempts by the unconscious to resolve some repressed conflict.

Freud first described dreams which were clearly wish-fulfillments, such as a dream of his own in which he visited Rome, a longtime ambition of his. For painful and uncomfortable dreams, Freud said that they indeed satisfied a wish in latent dream thoughts—that is, the existing thoughts and material from which a dream can be actualized—but that it was the work of interpretation to understand exactly how the wish manifested itself.

Freud rejected claims against his theory by patients. A patient of his once said she had a dream in which she spent time with her mother-in-law, and complained that wish fulfillment did not explain this dream, as she found her mother-in-law quite unpleasant; Freud responded that her real wish must have been to disprove his theory, in line with her earlier dissatisfaction for Freud's explanations. Freud's ideas about dream interpretation have been dropped as counterfactual or untestable by evidence-based psychologists in disciplines such as cognitive psychology.

References

Belief
Dream
Existentialist concepts
Existential therapy
Magical thinking
Motivation
Freudian psychology